Count  was a Japanese statesman and diplomat. He is the father of the poet and novelist Byakuren Yanagiwara.

Biography 
Yanagiwara Sakimitsu was born in Kyoto to the prominent Yanagiwara family. His sister was Yanagihara Naruko, a concubine of the Emperor Meiji and the mother of Emperor Taishō.

Upon Meiji Restoration, Yanagiwara entered the Ministry of Foreign Affairs. In 1872, he arrived in Tientsin on a mission of looking into the probability of a treaty between China and Japan. From 1874, he served as Minister Plenipotentiary to China.

References

19th-century diplomats
1850 births
1894 deaths
Ambassadors of Japan to China